In probability theory and statistics, the zeta distribution is a discrete probability distribution. If X is a zeta-distributed random variable with parameter s, then the probability that X takes the integer value k is given by the probability mass function

where ζ(s) is the Riemann zeta function (which is undefined for s = 1).

The multiplicities of distinct prime factors of X are independent random variables.

The  Riemann zeta function being the sum of all terms  for positive integer k, it appears thus as the normalization of the Zipf distribution. The terms "Zipf distribution" and the "zeta distribution" are often used interchangeably. But note that while the Zeta distribution is a probability distribution by itself, it is not associated to the Zipf's law with same exponent. See also Yule–Simon distribution

Definition  
The Zeta distribution is defined for positive integers , and its probability mass function is given by
 ,

The cumulative distribution function is given by
 
where  is the generalized harmonic number

Moments 

The nth raw moment is defined as the expected value of Xn:

The series on the right is just a series representation of the Riemann zeta function, but it only converges for values of  that are greater than unity. Thus:

Note that the ratio of the zeta functions is well defined, even for n > s − 1 because the series representation of the zeta function can be analytically continued. This does not change the fact that the moments are specified by the series itself, and are therefore undefined for large n.

Moment generating function 

The moment generating function is defined as

The series is just the definition of the polylogarithm, valid for  so that

 

Since this does not converge on an open interval containing , the moment generating function does not exist.

The case s = 1

ζ(1) is infinite as the harmonic series, and so the case when s = 1 is not meaningful.  However, if A is any set of positive integers that has a density, i.e. if

exists where N(A, n) is the number of members of A less than or equal to n, then

is equal to that density.

The latter limit can also exist in some cases in which A does not have a density.  For example, if A is the set of all positive integers whose first digit is d, then A has no density, but nonetheless the second limit given above exists and is proportional to

which is Benford's law.

Infinite divisibility

The Zeta distribution can be constructed with a sequence of independent random variables with a Geometric distribution. Let  be a prime number and  be a random variable with a Geometric distribution of parameter , namely

If the random variables  are independent, then, the random variable  defined by

has the Zeta distribution : .

Stated differently, the random variable  is infinitely divisible with Lévy measure given by the following sum of Dirac masses :

See also 

Other "power-law" distributions

Cauchy distribution
Lévy distribution
Lévy skew alpha-stable distribution
Pareto distribution
Zipf's law
Zipf–Mandelbrot law
Infinitely divisible distribution

External links 

   What Gut calls the "Riemann zeta distribution" is actually the probability distribution of −log X, where X is a random variable with what this article calls the zeta distribution.
 

Discrete distributions
Computational linguistics
Probability distributions with non-finite variance